The discography of Gnarls Barkley, an American alternative hip hop duo composed of record producer Danger Mouse and soul singer Cee Lo Green, consists of two studio albums, two extended plays, seven singles and seven music videos. The duo originally met in the late 1990s, and began to record music together in 2003 following the release of Danger Mouse's 2003 album Ghetto Pop Life. Their first single, "Crazy", was released in 2006; it achieved worldwide chart success, reaching number two on the US Billboard Hot 100 – where it was certified double platinum by the Recording Industry Association of America (RIAA) – and reaching the top ten of the Australian, New Zealand and Swiss singles charts, among others. It also topped the UK Singles Chart, attracting considerable attention for becoming the first song ever to top the chart on digital download sales alone, following a change to the chart's eligibility rules allowing songs to chart purely on digital sales providing that it was given a physical release the following week. The song appeared on Gnarls Barkley's debut studio album, St. Elsewhere, which peaked at number four on the US Billboard 200 as well as topping the New Zealand and United Kingdom albums charts. Three further singles – "Smiley Faces", which reached the top ten of the UK and Irish singles charts, "Who Cares?" and a cover of the Violent Femmes song "Gone Daddy Gone" – were released from St. Elsewhere, although none of them appeared on the Billboard Hot 100.

Gnarls Barkley's second studio album, The Odd Couple, was released on March 18, 2008 in the United States. Although it is stylistically similar to St. Elsewhere, The Odd Couple did not achieve the same commercial success as its predecessor, reaching number 12 on the Billboard 200 and the top 20 of a select few worldwide albums charts. None of the singles from The Odd Couple matched the worldwide success of "Crazy": "Run (I'm a Natural Disaster)", The Odd Couples first single, achieved minor success on several European singles charts, and "Going On", the second single, reached number 88 on the Billboard Hot 100. The album also spawned the single "Who's Gonna Save My Soul", which failed to appear on any major national chart.

Albums

Studio albums

Extended plays

Singles

Music videos

Notes

References

External links 
 
 
 

Discographies of American artists
Hip hop discographies